Lake St. Joseph (in English) or Lac Saint-Joseph (in French) may refer to:

Lakes
Lake St. Joseph, Ontario, Canada
Saint-Joseph Lake (La Jacques-Cartier), Quebec, Canada

Municipalities
Lac-Saint-Joseph, Quebec, Canada
Saint-Joseph-du-Lac, Quebec, Canada